Curtitoma exquisita is a species of sea snail, a marine gastropod mollusk in the family Mangeliidae.

Description

Distribution
This marine species occurs off Japan.

References

 Yokoyama, M. (1926) Fossil shells from Sado. Journal of the Faculty of Science, Imperial University, Tokyo, series 2, 1 (8) : 249–312

External links
  Tucker, J.K. 2004 Catalog of recent and fossil turrids (Mollusca: Gastropoda). Zootaxa 682: 1–1295.

exquisita